The "lost" covered bridges of Parke County covers the covered bridges of Parke County, Indiana, United States, that have been destroyed, either through floods, arson, or demolition.

Parke County is the self-proclaimed "Covered Bridge Capital of the World". The county claims to have more covered bridges than any other county in the United States. At one time as many as 52 1/2 covered bridges existed in Parke County. The half bridge comes from a shared bridge with Vermillion County that crossed the Wabash river. Today 31 of those bridges survive, 10 of which have been closed to vehicle traffic. Because of the numerous streams and creeks meander through the county and the ready natural resources to build the bridges, Parke County has many covered bridges.

Construction
Almost all of the bridges exteriors were built of poplar wood with interiors, trusses, arches and planking built of oak. The majority of the bridges were built using a Burr Arch or a double Burr Arch design.

Parke County also had two bridge builders that would build most of the bridges in the county. The first of these was J.J. Daniels. Born in 1826, in Marietta, Ohio, he would go on to build railroad bridges in Ohio and Indiana and 60 covered bridges in Indiana. Of these 60 bridges 27 alone were in Parke county with 11 of those still standing. The second was J.A. Britton. He was born just three miles east of Rockville, in 1838. Britton would go on to build 17 covered bridges in Parke County, with 12 of those still standing.

Bridgeton bridge arson
The Bridgeton bridge was burned by an arsonist in 2004, but the community rallied to raise funds for local craftsmen to build a new bridge based on the original blueprints in 2006.

List of bridges

Notes
 Sorting this column will result in bridges being listed in order by their length.

See also
 List of Registered Historic Places in Indiana
 List of Indiana covered bridges

References

Bibliography

External links

Bridges, covered